Santiago "Santi" Coch Castillo (born 27 May 1960) is a Spanish retired footballer who played as a defender, and is a manager.

He represented Gimnàstic over the course of 17 campaigns, appearing in 528 official matches.

Playing career
Born in Vimbodí i Poblet, Tarragona, Catalonia, Coch made his senior debuts with Gimnàstic de Tarragona in 1977, aged only 17, as his side achieved promotion from the Tercera División. Another promotion followed, and he made his professional debut on 16 September 1979, starting in a 3–2 home win against Deportivo de La Coruña in the Segunda División

Coch appeared in 23 matches during the 1979–80 season, as Nàstic suffered immediate relegation after finishing 19th. He appeared in Segunda División B but also in the fourth tier for the remainder of his career, retiring in 1994.

Managerial career
In 2005 Coch was appointed manager of Gimnàstic's farm team, CF Pobla de Mafumet. In 2010, he was relieved from his duties, being immediately included in Gimnàstic's backroom staff.

On 9 September 2017, after Lluís Carreras' dismissal, Coch was appointed Rodri's assistant in the first team.

Personal life
Coch's family is widely related to football. His older brother Enric was a goalkeeper, while his twin brother Ramón was a forward. His two sons Joel and Denis (both midfielders) represented Pobla, and his nephew Aleix is also a defender.

See also
List of one-club men

References

External links
Gimnàstic official profile 

1960 births
Living people
People from Conca de Barberà
Sportspeople from the Province of Tarragona
Twin sportspeople
Spanish twins
Spanish footballers
Footballers from Catalonia
Association football defenders
Segunda División players
Segunda División B players
Tercera División players
Gimnàstic de Tarragona footballers
Spanish football managers
CF Pobla de Mafumet managers